In 740, Zayd ibn Ali led an unsuccessful rebellion against the Umayyad Caliphate, that had taken over the Rashidun Caliphate since the death of his great-grandfather, Ali.

The revolt 
Unlike his brother, Muhammad al-Baqir, the fifth Imam of the Twelver and Isma'ili Shi'as, Zayd ibn Ali believed the time was ripe for renewing the rebellion against the Umayyad Caliphs in support of the claims of his own Hashemite clan. On his trip to Iraq, he was persuaded by pro-Alids of Kufa that he had support of 10,000 warriors and could easily drive out a few hundred Umayyad soldiers stationed there. Kufa had previously been the capital of his great-grandfather Ali. He started his propaganda in Kufa, Basra and Mosul and 15,000 people were enlisted on his army register. The Umayyad governor of Kufa, however, learned of the plot, and commanded the people to gather at the great mosque, locked them inside and began a search for Zayd.  Zayd with some troops fought his way to the mosque and called on people to come out.

However, in events that echoed Husayn's own abandonment by the Kufans decades earlier, the bulk of Zayd's supporters deserted him and joined the Umayyads, leaving Zayd with only a few dozen outnumbered followers.

Nevertheless, Zayd fought on. His small band of followers was soundly defeated by the much larger Umayyad force, and Zayd fell in battle to an arrow that pierced his forehead.  The arrow's removal led to his death.  He was buried in secret outside Kufa, but the Umayyads were able to find the burial place, and, in retribution for the rebellion, exhumed Zayd's body and crucified it. The corpse remained on the cross for three years. After the death of Hisham, the new caliph ordered his corpse to be burned. The ashes were scattered in the Euphrates.  When the Abbasids, who, like Zayd, were Hashemites, overthrew the Umayyads in 750, they in turn exhumed Hisham's body, crucified it, and burned it, out of revenge for Zayd.

Consequences
Zayd's desperate rebellion became the inspiration for the Zaydi sect, a school of Shi'a Islam that holds that any learned descendant of Ali can become an Imam by asserting and fighting for his claim as Zayd did (the rest of the Shi'as believe, in contrast, that the Imam must be divinely appointed).  However, all schools of Islam, including the majority Sunnis, regard Zayd as a righteous martyr (shahid) against what is regarded as the corrupt leadership of the Umayyads.  It is even reported that Abu Hanifa, founder of the largest school of Sunni jurisprudence, gave financial support to Zayd's revolt and called on others to join Zayd's rebellion.

Zayd's rebellion inspired other revolts by members of his clan, especially in the Hejaz, the most famous among these being the revolt of Muhammad al-Nafs az-Zakiyya against the Abbasids in 762. Zaydi agitation continued until 785 and re-erupted in Tabaristan under the leadership of the Zayd's son, Hasan ibn Zayd ibn Ali. His revolt attracted many supporters, among them the ruler of Rustamids, the son of Farīdūn (a descendant of Rostam Farrokhzād), Abd ar-Rahman ibn Rustam.

See also
Zayd ibn Ali
Hisham ibn Abd al-Malik
Zaydism
Husayn ibn Ali
Alids
Hashemites
Shi'a
Rafida
Rustamids
Farīdūn (the father of Abd ar-Rahman ibn Rustam, a descendant of Rostam Farrokhzād)

References

740
740s conflicts
740s in the Umayyad Caliphate
8th-century rebellions
Rebellions against the Umayyad Caliphate
Iraq under the Umayyad Caliphate
Zaidiyyah